Vani is a town in Imereti region of a western Georgia, at the Sulori river (a tributary of the Rioni river), 41 km southwest from the regional capital Kutaisi. The town with the population of 3,744 (2014) is an administrative center of the Municipality of Vani comprising also 40 neighbouring villages (total area – 557 km²; population – 24,512, 2014).

Systematic archaeological studies (N.Khoshtaria, O.Lortkiphanidze) carried out in the Vani environs since 1947 revealed the remnants of a rich city of the ancient power of Colchis. The name of this ancient settlement is still unknown but four distinct stages of uninterrupted occupation have been identified. The first phase is dated to the 8th to 7th centuries BC. In this period Vani is presumed to have been a major cultic centre. The second phase - end of the 7th and beginning of the 6th to the first half of the 4th century BC - is represented by cultural layers, remains of wooden structures, sacrificial altars cut in the rocky ground, and rich burials. It is assumed that on this stage Vani was the centre of a political-administrative unit of the kingdom of Colchis. The third phase covers the second half of the 4th to the first half of the 3rd century BC. It is represented largely by rich burials, remains of stone structures. To the fourth phase (3rd to mid-1st centuries BC) belong defensive walls, the so-called small gate, sanctuaries and cultic buildings (temples, altars sacrificial platforms), and the remains of a foundry for casting bronze statues. It is assumed that in the 3rd to 1st centuries BC Vani was a temple-city. According to the archaeological data, the city was destroyed in the mid-1st century BC. Subsequently, Vani declined to a village and was officially granted a status of a town only in 1981.

In a town Vani there is an interesting museum (founded in 1985), where some unique pieces of the ancient Colchis are exhibited.

International relations

Twin towns — sister cities
  Fallon, Nevada, United States
  Ashkelon, Israel – From 1990 
  Prosser, Washington, United States – From 2010 
  Amvrosiivka, Ukraine – From 2011

See also
 Imereti

Notes

Bibliography 
Lordkipanidze O., "Vani, An Ancient City of Colchis." Greek, Roman and Byzantine Studies. 32(2): 151-195, 16 plates. Durham, USA, 1991.

External links 
 Otar Lordkipanidze Vani Archeological Museum
 Vani, Georgia at the Archaeological Institute of America website
 Colchis, the land of the Golden Fleece

 
Archaeological sites in Georgia (country)
Cities and towns in Imereti
Kutaisi Governorate
Populated places in Vani Municipality